János Gonda (11 January 1932 – 10 March 2021) was a Hungarian jazz pianist. Born in Budapest, he studied at the Franz Liszt Academy of Music and earned his diploma first at the musicological and then in the piano department. His activities include composition, concert performances, teaching, and musicological research.

Music 
He formed his first band in 1962, and with them made the first LP in the Hungarian "Modern Jazz" series. He led several bands which are featured on anthology albums in the same series. In the late 1960s, he co-led the Gonda-Krusa Quartet with the Polish vibraphonist Richard Kruza. He also recorded with his Gonda Sextet, which he formed in 1972. One of their famous recordings is titled Shaman Song. The sextet consisted of János Gonda (piano, electrical piano), Gábor Balázs (bass), Tamás Berki (vocal, guitar, percussion), Péter Kántor (soprano and alto saxophone), István Dely (conga, percussion) and Gyula Kovács (drums, percussion).

As a composer, he mainly wrote jazz pieces, but also branched out into other musical forms. He wrote film scores, such as for the István Szabó film Father (Apa 1966), and other incidental music, his dance compositions and symphonic jazz works. The most significant of the last is his Australian Concerto of 1970. In 1974, he composed a musical entitled Pro Urbe.

Teaching and research 
Gonda's theoretical works also focused on jazz. Of his books and studies, the book Jazz, published in 1979, was the best-known.

He was a professor and head of the jazz department at the Béla Bartók Conservatory in Budapest, Hungary, and vice president of the International Jazz Federation.

Gonda was head of the jazz department affiliated with the Association of Hungarian Musicians. From 1965 to 1997, he was leader of the jazz department of the Franz Liszt Academy of Music. Gonda was the artistic director of Tatabánya International Jazz Camp and Tatabánya International Institute of Creative Music Education.

Awards 
In 1974, he was awarded the Hungarian Erkel Prize.

Discography 
 1964 Modern jazz IV-V. - Anthology 64  	Hungaroton  	LPX 7279-80  	Közreműködő
 1967 Modern jazz VI. - Anthology 67 	Hungaroton 	LPX 17372 	Közreműködő 	
 1968 	Modern jazz VII. - Anthology 68 	Hungaroton 	LPX 17392 	Közreműködő
 1969 	Modern jazz VIII. - Anthology 69 	Hungaroton 	LPX 17406 	Közreműködő
 1976 Sámánének (Shaman Song)	         Hungaroton-Pepita
 1980 Vonzások és választósok 	         Hungaroton-Pepita
 1980 Solo Piano                            Hungaroton-Pepita
 1986 Keyboard Music	 	         Hungaroton-Krém
 1999 Képek, Emlékek (Pictures, Memories)   Binder Music Manufactory 	BMM 9904-26173630 	Saját

Film scores
 1975	A járvány 
 1974	Holnap lesz fácán 
 1972	Utazás Jakabbal 
 1970	Mérsékelt égöv 
 1970	Horizont
 1970	Szerelmesfilm
 1970	A gyilkos a házban van
 1967	A múmia közbeszól
 1966	Apa - egy hit naplója 
 1965	Szentjános fejevétele
 1964	Karambol
 1963	Nappali sötétség

Writing 
 1979 Jazz
 1982 Mi a Jazz? (What is Jazz?)
 2004 Jazzvilág (World of Jazz) RÓZSAVÖLGYI ÉS TÁRSA publishers,

References

External links 
 
 

1932 births
2021 deaths
Hungarian jazz pianists
Franz Liszt Academy of Music alumni
Academic staff of the Franz Liszt Academy of Music
20th-century pianists
20th-century Hungarian musicians
20th-century Hungarian male musicians
21st-century pianists
21st-century Hungarian musicians
21st-century Hungarian male musicians
Male jazz musicians
Musicians from Budapest